Gökhan Öner (born 1972 in Mersin) is a Turkish volleyball player. He is 193 cm tall and team captain. He has played for the Arkas Spor Izmir team since the start of the 2007–2008 season and wears 10 number. He played 225 times for the national team. He also played for Arçelik, Halkbank Ankara and Fenerbahçe.

He won the 2008–09 GM Capital Challenge Cup playing with Arkas Spor Izmir and was awarded "Best Spiker" and Best Server".

Clubs
  Arkas Spor Izmir (2008–2009)

Awards

Individuals
 2008–09 GM Capital Challenge Cup "Best Spiker"
 2008–09 GM Capital Challenge Cup "Best Server"

Clubs
 2008–09 GM Capital Challenge Cup -  Champion, with Arkas Spor Izmir

References

External links
 Player profile at arkasspor.com

1972 births
Living people
Turkish men's volleyball players
Fenerbahçe volleyballers
Halkbank volleyball players
Arkas Spor volleyball players